Petit Nevis is a small, privately owned island in the Grenadines, off the coast of Bequia.  The island is uninhabited but is used by whalers to flense their catches. That practice is now limited  by law to conserve the endangered whale population.

Whaling by early settlers to Bequia was undertaken to help feed their isolated community. Hunting is still carried out in small boats using a hand-held harpoon, a skill passed down through generations and promoted by local whale boat captain, Athneal Ollivierre (died 2000), who was also part-owner of Petit Nevis.

Eileen Corea, the last surviving, direct, legal owner of the island, died in July 2011. The island is now owned by the descendants of the previous owners.

A small isolationist community called Moonhole on nearby Bequia scavenges whale bones from the island for building materials.

References

Uninhabited islands of Saint Vincent and the Grenadines
Private islands of Saint Vincent and the Grenadines